Rick Darrin Wasserman is an American voice, stage and television actor.

Early life and career
He graduated from Temple University with a BA in Theatre in 1995 and later from the University of Missouri with a MFA in Acting in 1998.

His best known voice over roles include Thor and other characters on The Avengers: Earth's Mightiest Heroes, Clayface in Batman: Arkham City, Nicholai Ginovaef in Resident Evil: Operation Raccoon City and Hulk in Planet Hulk.

Wasserman has had a prolific career on stage since the late 1990s. In 2000, he played Irving Berlin in The Wilma Theater's production of The Tin Pan Alley Rag. In addition to critical acclaim, he also received a nomination for The John Barrymore Award for his performance.

Filmography

Theatre
 Babes in Arms – Steve Edwards
 Brighton Beach Memoirs – Stan
 Complete Female Stage Beauty – Thomas Betterton
 Hamlet – Marcellus, Lucianus
 Happy End – Bill Cracker
 Henry IV, Part 1 – Hotspur
 Henry VIII – The Duke of Orleans
 Last Night of Ballyhoo – Joe Farcus, Peachy Weil
 Letters from Cuba – Enrique
 Lie of the Mind – Frankie
 Little Shop of Horrors – Seymour
 Love's Labor Lost – Costard
 Measure for Measure – Pompey
 Philadelphia, Here I Come! – Private Gar
 Richard III – Richard III
 Say Goodnight – George Burns
 The Baby Dance
 The Beaux' Stratagem – Archer
 The Last Days of Judas Iscariot – Freud, Matthew and Thomas
 The Lion King – Scar, Timon, Pumbaa, Zazu
 The Sunshine Boys
 The Tin Pan Alley Rag – Irving Berlin

Live-action

Television

Voice acting

Film

Television

Video games

 Gears of War 3 – Michael Barrick
 The Bureau: XCOM Declassified – Origin
 Warcraft series - Sargeras

Rides/Attractions

References

External links
 The Official Rick D. Wasserman Website
 

Living people
American male voice actors
American male stage actors
American male video game actors
Year of birth missing (living people)
Place of birth missing (living people)
Temple University alumni
University of Missouri alumni
American people of German descent